The 9K120 Svir, 9K119 Refleks, 9K119M Refleks-M (NATO reporting name AT-11 Sniper) are laser beam riding, guided anti-tank missile systems developed in the Soviet Union. Both are designed to be fired from smoothbore 125 mm tank and anti-tank guns (2A45, 2A46 and 2A46M). The name Svir comes from the River Svir, while Refleks means reflex.

History
The first guided anti-tank missile system fired from smoothbore 125 mm tank guns and named 9K112 Kobra appeared on Soviet T-64Б tanks ("Б" means "B" in Russian) in 1976. But they were incompatible with automatic loading system of the T-72 tanks (while the T-64 also had an automatic loading system, it was very different from the one in T-72). So the new missile system was developed for T-72.

9K120 Svir
The Svir is used with the T-72Б tank series since 1984.

9K119 Refleks
The Refleks appeared in 1992 and was installed in T-90 tank series.

It has also been produced by the People's Republic of China for use with its Type 99 tank. 

The Indian defence ministry has signed a contract with Bharat Dynamics Limited (BDL), a public sector company under Department of Defence Production, for supplying Invar Anti Tank Guided Missiles to the Indian Army. BDL has been manufacturing these missiles under technical collaboration with Rosoboronexport. It can also be fired from the 2A45 Sprut-B anti-tank gun.

9K119M Refleks-M
The Refleks-M system is installed in T-90A and T-90M tanks. It's missiles, called 9M119M "Invar",  are ejected by the 9Kh949 ejecting device and the rocket motor is ignited after the missile leaves the barrel. Ram air collected by the air intakes in the nose is used to provide power to move the control fins. The 17.2 kg (37.8 pound) missile is 690 mm (27.1 inches) long and has pop-out fins (with a 250 mm/69 girth span) that aid in guidance. The missile is guided by the modulated laser beam steered by the tank gunner. The missile has a maximum range of 5,000 meters at a speed of 350 meters per second (17.69 seconds max flight time). The Svir/Reflex enables the tank to hit targets at twice the range of the 125mm shells. The tandem warhead can penetrate up to 900 mm of armor (35.4 inches). Missile 9M119M "Invar" was put into service in 1992, and the missile 9M119M1 "Invar-M" in the second half of the 1990s. There are also high explosive versions produced named 9M119F and 9M119F1 which are intended to defeat enemy personnel.

Similar weapons
 United States: MGM-51 Shillelagh used with the M551 Sheridan light tank, and the short lived M60A2 MBT.
 United States: XM1111 Mid-Range Munition which was attempted to be developed for the M1A2 SEP Abrams MBT.
 Russia: 9K112 Kobra (AT-8 Songster) is also fired through 125-mm smoothbore gun tubes.
 India: SAMHO fired from 120mm main gun of Arjun MBT.
 Israel: LAHAT, used with their 105 and 120-mm gun tubes.
 France:  142mm anti-tank missile, tested on a version of the AMX-30 MBT.
 Ukraine:  tandem-warhead ATGM with a 5,000-m effective range, fired from 125-mm smoothbore guns. 950 mm penetration.
 Iran: Reversed engineered version of the Svir with max range of 4,000 meters named Tondar.

Specifications

 Range:
 Svir: 75 to 4,000 m
 Refleks: 75 to 5,000 m
 Weight (complete round):
 Svir: 28 kg
 Refleks: 24.3 kg
 Missile Weight:
 Svir: 16.5 kg
 Refleks: 17.2 kg
 Warhead: Tandem HEAT
 Penetration: 700–900 mm of RHA
 Time of flight to 4,000 m: 11.7 s
 Time of flight to 5,000 m: 17.6 s

Operators

Current operators
 
 
 
 
 
  9K120 variant, used in Moroccan Army T-72Bs.
  - according to SIPRI Pakistan received 1,920 9M119 from Belarus by 1999 to be used on its T-80UD, although current status uncertain
 
 
  Captured 30 examples from retreating Russian Army positions in Kharkiv oblast September 2022.

Former operators
  - Passed on to Russia.
  - Retired in early 2019, with the T-80U Main battle tanks.

Citations

Bibliography

 Jane's Ammunition Handbook 2003–2004.
 RED THRUST STAR : U.S. Forces Command OPFOR Training Program
 FM 3-19.4 : Weapon Appendix

Anti-tank guided missiles of Russia
Anti-tank guided missiles of the Soviet Union
Anti-tank guided missiles of the Cold War
KBP Instrument Design Bureau products
Degtyarev Plant products
Military equipment introduced in the 1980s